Bowhill House is a historic house near Bowhill at Selkirk in the Scottish Borders area of Scotland. It is a member of the Historic Houses Association, and is one of the homes of the Duke of Buccleuch. The house is protected as a Category A listed building, and the grounds are listed on the Inventory of Gardens and Designed Landscapes in Scotland.

History
Bowhill was built in 1708 by John, Lord Bowhill. His brother William Murray had bought the land earlier in 1690. In 1747, Francis Scott, 2nd Duke of Buccleuch, bought Bowhill for his son Lord Charles Scott who wanted to stand for Parliament in Roxburgh or Selkirk.

In 1767, Henry, the third Duke, started to plant forests in the grounds, and in 1800, the 4th Duke Charles started to revamp what was an occasional summer house and turned it into a villa with gallery hall. The Buccleagh art collection was created as Charles and Elizabeth brought together the three family heritages of Montagu, Douglas and Scott.

Walter, 5th Duke, made many changes and, in 1831, moved the entrance from south to north.

Bowhill House is one of the homes of the huge private art collection. In the dining room are works by Canaletto, Gainsborough, and Reynolds. The collection has been gathered over 600 years and it includes 1,000 miniatures and 500 paintings as well as objets d'art. The Buccleuch collection of miniatures is said to second only to the Royal Collection. The whole collection is exhibited at three locations: Bowhill, Drumlanrig Castle and Boughton House.

The gardens and the house are open to the public. The facilities include walks and an adventure playground.

See also
 List of places in the Scottish Borders
 Treasure Houses of Britain – 1985 TV series with information on Bowhill, as well as other Buccleuch properties

References

External links

Bowhill House website

SCRAN: Aerial View of Bowhill (Home of the Buccleuchs) (silent videoclip)
Gazetteer for Scotland: Bowhill Estate
Bowhill House Scottish Borders Heritage: Bowhill House
Bowhill House: Member of Historic Houses Association

Country houses in the Scottish Borders
Scottish gardens in the English Landscape Garden style
Gardens in the Scottish Borders
Category A listed buildings in the Scottish Borders
Inventory of Gardens and Designed Landscapes
Listed houses in Scotland
Bowhill House